Streptomyces roseoviridis is a bacterium species from the genus of Streptomyces which has been isolated from soil. Streptomyces roseoviridis produces histargin, an inhibitor of carboxypeptidase B.

See also 
 List of Streptomyces species

References

Further reading

External links
Type strain of Streptomyces roseoviridis at BacDive -  the Bacterial Diversity Metadatabase

roseoviridis
Bacteria described in 1958